Ivory Forest is a recording by a quartet led by pianist Hal Galper. It was released on the Enja Label in 1980. It features a 28-year-old John Scofield, whose 1979 Enja album Rough House featured Galper and drummer Adam Nussbaum in a similar quartet context. Nussbaum and Scofield also formed part of the Dave Liebman Quintet at this time, and played together in Scofield's trio from 1980 to 1983.

The album opens with two solo instrumental performances of pieces from the jazz standard repertoire. First, Scofield plays a solo guitar arrangement of Thelonious Monk's "Monk's Mood", and then Galper plays a solo arrangement of the Latin American popular song Yellow Days. The rest of the album features quartet performances of compositions written by Galper.

Track listing 
"Monk's Mood" (Thelonious Monk) – 5:58 (solo guitar)
"Yellows Days" (Alan Bernstein/Álvaro Carrillo) – 3:48 (solo piano)
"Rapunzel's Luncheonette" (Hal Galper) – 9:36
"Ivory Forest" (Hal Galper) – 7:36
"Continuity" (Hal Galper) – 6:32
"My Dog Spot" (Hal Galper) – 6:31

Personnel 
 Hal Galper - Piano
 John Scofield - Guitar
 Wayne Dockery - Bass
 Adam Nussbaum - drums

References

1980 albums
Enja Records albums
Jazz albums by American artists
1980s jazz standards